Nancy King may refer to:

 Nancy J. King, US politician
 Nancy King (baseball), AAGPBL player
 Nancy King (jazz singer)
 Nancy King, a Chippewa and Potawatomi artist, known as Chief Lady Bird professionally